Varo is a small uninhabited island in the Malampa Province of Vanuatu.

Geography
Varo is located close to Malekula Island.  The two neighboring islands are Arseo and Leumanang. Although uninhabited, Varo is used by local people on a nearby island for fishing.

References

Uninhabited islands of Vanuatu
Malampa Province